Edinburgh University Theatre Company (EUTC) is a student theatre company at the University of Edinburgh. The EUTC was founded in 1871 as the Edinburgh University Amateur Dramatic Club and adopted its current name in the 1970s. Since 1980 it has run the Bedlam Theatre.

History 

EUTC was founded in 1871 as the Edinburgh University Amateur Dramatic Club It adopted its current name in the 1970s. The EUTC were given sole residency of the Bedlam Theatre building on 31 January 1980.

The EUTC is one of several amateur dramatics societies affiliated to the Edinburgh University Students' Association. The EUTC is responsible (through a Committee elected at the company's AGM) for most aspects the theatre's administration and produces the vast majority of its shows.

Most members of the EUTC are students or former students of the University of Edinburgh. Shows are proposed to the EUTC at a General Meeting, where they are selected by a general vote. All show proposals must have, at the very least, a director, producer (organisation, finances and publicity), technician (lighting, sound and special effects) and stage manager or set manager (set building, props and costumes). Once a show is selected, it will be fully supported by the EUTC, who also provide a block grant depending on the show's classification.

The company stages a show most weeks during term time. The standard schedule consists of Lunchtimes (small-scale shows with one or two performances, no longer exclusively performed in the afternoon), Mainterms (larger-budget shows with at least three performances in the early evening) and Festivals (usually week-long events, sometimes incorporating more than twenty productions selected by the elected festival team). The most important Festivals take place in Freshers Week and early January. These can be supplemented with Extraordinaries, which are usually one of performances which do not fit easily into any of the previous categories.

The EUTC runs the Bedlam Youth Project aims to introduce children to the various disciplines of theatre. In 2009, they visited Brussels to help run 'Featlets', a youth theatre subsidiary of the Festival of European Anglophone Theatre Societies (FEATS). In 2016, children were involved in a week long Easter camp at Bedlam Theatre, where they devised and performed their interpretation of The Jungle Book, with the assistance of the Youth Project Team.

The Improverts 
Bedlam's longest running show is the acclaimed improvised comedy troupe The Improverts. They perform every year at the Edinburgh Festival Fringe and every Friday night at 10:30 during termtime. They are Edinburgh's longest-running improv troupe.

Edinburgh Festival Fringe 
Bedlam Theatre has operated as Venue 49 in the Edinburgh Festival Fringe since it was given to the EUTC in 1980. Today, Bedlam Fringe is almost completely separate from the termtime EUTC, who hand over control of Bedlam on 1 June each year. It is run by a Fringe Venue Manager, who for historical and liaison reasons is technically a member of the termtime EUTC Committee. However, they and other members of the senior management team are technically volunteers for the Edinburgh University Students' Association (EUSA), who report to EUSA and receive a EUSA honorarium rather than a wage. Other Bedlam Fringe staff are EUSA employees.

The Fringe Venue Manager must allocate at least one slot to productions selected by the EUTC. The EUTC usually has two slots allocated to it; one is traditionally taken up by The Improverts (though they must be democratically selected like all other Fringe proposals), and the other by a theatrical production.

Alumni 
Friends of Bedlam is the alumni association for the EUTC and its predecessors. Well known alumni include:

References

External links
 Bedlam Theatre
 EUSA: Theatre Company (Bedlam)

Clubs and societies of the University of Edinburgh
Amateur theatre companies in Scotland
Student theatre in Scotland
Theatre in Edinburgh
1871 establishments in Scotland